WCRS-LP is a North American community radio station in Columbus, Ohio, area. It broadcasts 24 hours a day, seven days a week and has an online stream available 24/7.  WCRS-LP broadcasts on 92.7 and on translator station W252AY 98.3 FM in most of Franklin County, licensed to Marble Cliff. WCRS-LP is owned by The Neighborhood Network and is affiliated with the Pacifica Radio Network.

The station is a not-for-profit, volunteer, non-commercial, low power community radio station which plays death metal and French electronica.

The station was assigned the WCRS-LP call letters by the Federal Communications Commission on March 30, 2006.

Among the programs on WCRS-LP are Democracy Now!, Street Fight Radio, and English, French, Somali, and Spanish-language public affairs programs.

History
 June 2007: WCRS-LP begins operations and returning community radio to Central Ohio.
 August 2008: FCC approves expansion of hours from 5 daily to 13 daily.
 October 1, 2008: WCRS-LP begins 13 hours of daily broadcast with a crew of 45 volunteers.
 January 1, 2009: WCRS-LP begins 24/7 web streaming of both its on-air broadcast and web-only content.
 January 23, 2017: station changes its call sign to the current WCRM-LP
 August 2017: station transfer 102.1 frequency to Pri-Value Foundation and resumes broadcasting at 92.7 with WCRS-LP call-sign.
 December 2017: station resumes broadcasting of 98.3

See also
Columbus Free Press
Bob Fitrakis
Harvey Wasserman 
List of community radio stations in the United States

References

External links
WCRS Low Power FM Community Radio
Talktainment Radio
WGRN
 
 

CRS-LP
Community radio stations in the United States
CRS-LP
Radio stations established in 2007
2007 establishments in Ohio